The Morgan Nunataks are a small group of nunataks located at the southwestern extremity of the Sweeney Mountains, in Palmer Land, Antarctica. They were first observed from the air by the Ronne Antarctic Research Expedition in 1947–48, and were mapped by the United States Geological Survey from surveys and U.S. Navy air photos, 1961–67. The group was named by the Advisory Committee on Antarctic Names for William R. Morgan, a cook at Eights Station in 1965.

References

Nunataks of Palmer Land